Gutierre Álvarez de Toledo was a Roman Catholic prelate who served as Bishop of Plasencia (1496–1506). He was also appointed as Archbishop of Seville in 1506, but it is unlikely that he ever took possession of the see.

Life and career 
He was the second son of García Álvarez de Toledo, 1st Duke of Alba. On 27 June 1496, Gutierre Álvarez de Toledo was appointed during the papacy of Pope Alexander VI as Bishop of Plasencia. On 28 August 1506, he was appointed during the papacy of Pope Julius II as Archbishop of Seville. It is unlikely that he ever took possession of the archdiocese, as the incumbent Diego de Deza is listed as serving from 1504 to 1523.

References

External links and additional sources
 (for Chronology of Bishops)  
 (for Chronology of Bishops) 
 (for Chronology of Bishops) 
 (for Chronology of Bishops) 

15th-century Roman Catholic bishops in Castile
16th-century Roman Catholic bishops in Spain
Bishops appointed by Pope Alexander VI
Bishops appointed by Pope Julius II